This is a list of presidents of the Municipality of Kragujevac and Mayors of Kragujevac since 1920.

The Mayor of Kragujevac is the head of the City of Kragujevac (the fourth largest city in Serbia). He acts on behalf of the city, and performs an executive function in the City of Kragujevac. The current Mayor of Kragujevac is Nikola Dašić (SNS).

Kingdom of Serbs, Croats and Slovenes / Kingdom of Yugoslavia
Vojislav Kalanović (1920 – 1933)
Aleksa Obradović (1933 – 1935)
Kamenko Božić (1935 – 1938)
Dragomir Simović (1938 – 1939)
Miloš Stevović (1939 – 1940)

DF Yugoslavia / FPR Yugoslavia / SFR Yugoslavia
Milutin Marković (1944 – 1947) (League of Communists of Yugoslavia)
Milorad Mitrović (1947 – 1949) (League of Communists of Yugoslavia)
Sreten Nikolić (1949 – 1950) (League of Communists of Yugoslavia)
Momir Marković (1950 – 1955) (League of Communists of Yugoslavia)
Momčilo Petrović (1955 – 1957) (League of Communists of Yugoslavia)
Blagoje Kojadinović (1957 – 1963) (League of Communists of Yugoslavia)
Obren Stojanović (1963 – 1967) (League of Communists of Yugoslavia)
Milan Đoković (1967 – 1972) (League of Communists of Yugoslavia)
Borivoje Petrović (1972 – 1981) (League of Communists of Yugoslavia)
Milutin Milojević (1981 – 1984) (League of Communists of Yugoslavia)
Kamenko Sretenović (1984 – 1988) (League of Communists of Yugoslavia)
Predrag Galović (1988 – 1989) (League of Communists of Yugoslavia)
Srboljub Vasović (1989 – 1992) (League of Communists of Yugoslavia / Socialist Party of Serbia)

FR Yugoslavia / Serbia and Montenegro

Republic of Serbia

Sources
Web Page of the City of Kragujevac

Kragujevac
 
Kragujevac